Dalein (Pular:  𞤂𞤫𞤧-𞤯𞤢𞤤𞤭𞥅𞤪𞤫 𞤁𞤢𞤤𞤫𞤲) is a town and sub-prefecture in the Labé Prefecture in the Labé Region of northern-central Guinea.

References 

Sub-prefectures of the Labé Region